Maurolicus japonicus, commonly known as the North Pacific lightfish, is a species of ray-finned fish in the genus Maurolicus. It is found the North Pacific.

References 

Fish described in 1915
Sternoptychidae